X!NK is a Belgian pop punk band. The band consisted of two pairs of brothers: Jonas and Niels Meukens, and Thomas and Philip Valkiers. Jonas was the lead singer and occasionally the second guitarist, his brother Niels was the drummer. Philip played the bass guitar and Thomas played the guitar and also occasionally the keyboard. X!NK gained mainstream success after becoming Belgium's submission for the 2003 Junior Eurovision Song Contest where they took sixth place. The band was also the subject of a series of comic books by Mario Boon. The band is planning on making a comeback with a new song and four concerts in 2023.

History

Junior Eurovision Song Contest
In the national qualifying rounds for the Junior Eurovision Song Contest in Belgium, X!NK competed against nine other contestants: Laura, Martijn, Remi, Kia, Jelly Pie, Simon MC, the twin girls Tonya and Charlotte. X!NK beat, Tonya the second-place winner with a difference of 3 points.

The band then represented Belgium at the first Junior Eurovision Song Contest on 15 November 2003 with the song "De Vriendschapsband" (The Bond/Band Between/Of Friends). The song, which they wrote themselves, is about the origin of their band and their friendship. In the field of 16 contestants, they ended in sixth place with 83 points at the final in Copenhagen, Denmark. The first place was for Dino representing Croatia and the second place for Sergio from Spain with a song dedicated to his mother who died some months before the contest.

Like the other contestants, they got to record their entry in a studio with a professional producer, in their case Paul Despiegelaere. Their winning song was released as a single.

After the Junior Eurovision Song Contest
X!NK launched their second single, named "Oh-Ho" in the beginning of 2004. Later that year their first album, containing twelve songs was released. The album went gold in Flanders (the Dutch language area of Belgium).

X!NK often perform at rock festivals in Belgium (for example Marktrock in Leuven). In 2004, they released the song "Laat Me Vrij" (Let Me Free) which served as the theme song for the Flemish version of Garfield. For the sequel to Ice Age, Ice Age: The Meltdown which debuted in Flemish cinemas on 31 March 2006, they recorded the song "De Andere Kant" (The Other Side) which served as the theme song for this film. Lead singer Jonas also provided the Dutch voice for the character Jimmy the Anteater in the film.

Their second album Vergif (Poison) was released on 30 September 2005.
They also performed on the big 0110-event in Belgium. They opened the show in Ghent. 

The band announced their split in 2009.

Recently Niels and Thomas also play in another Belgian band called The Crackups with two other musicians.

Reunion concert and comeback
X!NK announced they would reunite for a concert in Brussels. When the concert sold out within minutes, the band announced three more shows, which are all sold out as well.  The band later announced new music, with a new lead single 'Misschien'.

Discography

Albums

Singles

References
Part of this article is translated from the corresponding article from the Dutch Wikipedia, retrieved 7 April 2007.

External links
  Official website featuring tour guide, biography, pictures, news and audio.
 X!NK at the Boy Choir & Soloist Directory.
  The X!NK comic book series at Dupuis.com (Google cache)

Junior Eurovision Song Contest entrants for Belgium
Dupuis titles
Belgian punk rock groups
Musical groups reestablished in 2001